Freeman Wills Crofts FRSA (1 June 1879 – 11 April 1957) was an Irish mystery author, best remembered for the character of Inspector Joseph French.

A railway engineer by training, Crofts introduced railway themes into many of his stories, which were notable for their intricate planning. Although outshone by Agatha Christie, Raymond Chandler and other more celebrated authors from the golden age of detective fiction, he was highly esteemed by those authors, and many of his books are still in print.

Birth and education
Crofts was born at 26 Waterloo Road, Dublin, Ireland. His father, also named Freeman Wills Crofts, was a surgeon-lieutenant in the Army Medical Service but he died of fever in Honduras before the young Freeman Wills Crofts was born. In 1883, Crofts' mother, née Celia Frances Wise, married the Venerable Jonathan Harding, Vicar of Gilford, County Down, later Archdeacon of Dromore, and Crofts was brought up in the vicarage at Gilford. He attended Methodist College and Campbell College in Belfast. In 1912 he married Mary Bellas Canning, daughter of the manager of the Coleraine branch of the Provincial Bank.

Engineering career
In 1896, at the age of seventeen, Crofts was apprenticed to his maternal uncle, Berkeley Deane Wise, who was chief engineer of the Belfast and Northern Counties Railway. In 1899 Crofts was appointed Junior Assistant on the construction of the Londonderry and Strabane Extension of the Donegal Railway. In 1900 he became District Engineer at Coleraine for the L.M.S. Northern Counties Committee at a salary of £100pa, living at 11 Lodge Road in the town. In 1922 Crofts was promoted to Chief Assistant Engineer of the railway, based in Belfast. He lived at 'Grianon' in Jordanstown, a quiet village some six miles north of Belfast, where it was convenient for Crofts to travel by train each day to the railway's offices at York Road. One of the projects he worked on was the design of the 'Bleach Green Viaduct' in Whiteabbey, close to his Jordanstown home. This was a significant 10 arch reinforced concrete viaduct approved in 1927 and completed in 1934. It carried a new loop line which eliminated the need for trains between Belfast and the north west to reverse at Greenisland. Croft continued his engineering career until 1929. In his last task as an engineer, he was commissioned by the Government of Northern Ireland to chair an inquiry into the Bann and Lough Neagh Drainage Scheme.

Writing career
In 1919, during an absence from work due to a long illness, Crofts wrote his first novel, The Cask (1920), which established him as a new master of detective fiction. Crofts continued to write steadily, producing a book almost every year for thirty years, in addition to a number of short stories and plays.

He is best remembered for his favourite detective, Inspector Joseph French, who was introduced in his fifth book, Inspector French's Greatest Case (1924). Inspector French always set about unravelling each of the mysteries presented him in a workmanlike, precise manner – this approach set him apart from most other fictional sleuths.

In 1929, he abandoned his railway engineering career and became a full-time writer. He settled in the village of Blackheath, near Guildford, in Surrey, and a number of his books are set in the Guildford area, including The Hog's Back Mystery (1933) and Crime at Guildford (1935). Many of his stories have a railway theme, and his particular interest in the apparently unbreakable alibi often focused on the intricacies of railway timetables. At the end of his life, he and his wife moved to Worthing, Sussex in 1953, where they lived until his death in 1957, the year in which his last book was published.

Crofts also wrote one religious book, The Four Gospels in One Story, several short stories, and short plays for the BBC.

Marriage, affiliations and other interests
In 1912 he wed Mary Bellas Canning, the daughter of John J. C. Canning of Coleraine, Ireland, bank manager. They had no children.

He was a member, with Dorothy L. Sayers and Agatha Christie, of the Detection Club which met in Gerrard Street.

In 1939 he was elected a fellow of the Royal Society of Arts.

Crofts was not only a railway engineer and writer, but also an accomplished musician. He was organist and choirmaster in Killowen Parish Church, Coleraine, St Patrick's Church, Jordanstown and the parish church of St Martin's in Blackheath.

Reputation
Crofts was esteemed, not only by his regular readers, but also by his fellow writers of the so-called Golden Age of Detective Fiction. Agatha Christie included parodies of Inspector French alongside Sherlock Holmes and her own Hercule Poirot in Partners in Crime (1929).

Raymond Chandler described him as "the soundest builder of them all when he doesn’t get too fancy" (in The Simple Art of Murder). His attention to detail and his concentration on the mechanics of detection makes him the forerunner of the "police procedural" school of crime fiction.

However, it has also given rise to a suggestion of a certain lack of flair – Julian Symons describing him as of "the humdrum school". This may explain why his name has not remained as familiar as other more colourful and imaginative Golden Age writers, although he had 15 books included in the Penguin Books "green" series of the best detective novels and 36 of his books were in print in paperback in 2000.

List of works

Novels
 The Cask (1920)
 The Ponson Case (1921)
 The Pit-Prop Syndicate (1922)
 The Groote Park Murder (1923)
 Inspector French's Greatest Case (1924)
 The Cheyne Mystery (1926) a.k.a. Inspector French and the Cheyne Mystery
 Inspector French and the Starvel Tragedy (1927) a.k.a. The Starvel Hollow Tragedy
 The Sea Mystery (1928)
 The Box Office Murders (1929) a.k.a. The Purple Sickle Murders
 Sir John Magill's Last Journey (1930)
 Mystery in the Channel (1931) a.k.a. Mystery in the English Channel
 Sudden Death (1932)
 Death on the Way (1932) a.k.a. Double Death
 The Hog's Back Mystery (1933) a.k.a. The Strange Case of Dr. Earle
 The 12:30 from Croydon (1934) a.k.a. Wilful and Premeditated
 Mystery on Southampton Water (1934) a.k.a. Crime on the Solent
 Crime at Guildford (1935) a.k.a. The Crime at Nornes
 The Loss of the Jane Vosper (1936)
 Man Overboard! (1936) a.k.a. Cold-Blooded Murder
 Found Floating (1937). Serialised, Daily Mail (1937)
 The End of Andrew Harrison (1938) a.k.a. The Futile Alibi
 Antidote to Venom (1938)
 Fatal Venture (1939) a.k.a. Tragedy in the Hollow
 Golden Ashes (1940)
 James Tarrant, Adventurer (1941) a.k.a. Circumstantial Evidence
 The Losing Game (1941) a.k.a. A Losing Game
 Fear Comes to Chalfont (1942)
 The Affair at Little Wokeham (1943) a.k.a. Double Tragedy
 Enemy Unseen (1945)
 Death of a Train (1946). Serialised, New York Daily News (1946)
 Young Robin Brand, Detective (1947) A Juvenile Detective Novel with Inspector French.
 Silence for the Murderer (1949). Serialised, New York Daily News (1948)
 French Strikes Oil (1951) a.k.a. Dark Journey
 Anything to Declare? (1957)

Short story collections
 Murderers Make Mistakes (1947)
Part One: Double Stories:
 The Old Gun
 The Cliff Path
 The Telephone Call 
 The Lower Flat 
 The Army Truck
 The Invalid Colonel
 The Hidden Sten Gun
 The Hunt Ball
 The Avaricious Moneylender
 The Evening Visitor
 The Enthusiastic Rabbit-Breeder
 The Retired Wine Merchant
Part Two: Single Stories:
 The Home Guard Trench
 The Playwright's Manuscript
 The Limestone Quarry
 The L-Shaped Room
 The Stolen Hand Grenade
 The Relief Signalman
 The Burning Barn
 The Solicitors' Holiday
 The Swinging Boom
 The Fireside Mountaineer
 The Waiting Car
 Many a Slip (1955)
 The Aspirins
 Boomerang
 The Broken Windscreen
 The Brothers Bing
 Crime on the Footplate
 The 8:12 from Waterloo
 The Flowing Tide
 The Footbridge
 Gull Rock
The Icy Torrent
 The Medicine Bottle
 The Mountain Ledge
 Mushroom Patties
 The New Cement
 The Photograph
 The Ruined Tower
 The Sign Manual
 The Suitcase
 Tea at Four
 The Unseen Observer
 The Upper Flat
 Mystery of the Sleeping Car Express and Other Stories (1956)
 The Mystery of the Sleeping Car Express" (1921)
 Mr Pemberton's Commission
 The Greuze (Inspector French)
 The Level Crossing" (1933)
 East Wind (Inspector French)
 The Parcel
 The Motive Shows the Man
 The Affair at Saltover Priory (Inspector French)
 The Landing Ticket (Inspector French)
 The Raincoat (Inspector French)

 The 9:50 Up Express and Other Mysteries. Crippen & Landru (2020) Edited by Tony Medawar, including a biographical note and comprehensive bibliography
 Contents
 The Master Of Alibis - by Tony Medawar
 Part One:
 The Casebook Of Inspector French:
 Meet Inspector French
 The Vertical Line
 The Hunt Ball Murder
 The Faulty Stroke
 Teamwork Felonius
 Dark Waters
 The Target
 The 9.50 Up Express
 During The Night
 Part Two:
 Meet Robin Brand
 Perilous Journey
 Danger In Shroude Valley
 Part Three:
 Other Stories:
 James Alcorn's Oversight
 Murder By Deputy
 Appendix A:
 Why I write Detective Stories
 Appendix B:
 Who Killed Cock Robin ?
 Bibliography

Stage plays
 Inspector French (a stage adaptation of the 1932 novel Sudden Death)
 During the Night (Revised version of Inspector French)
The program for Inspector French advises the audience that the clues that enable the mystery to be solved are all given before the beginning of Act II. The play had two productions in Guildford in July and October 1937. The revised version in 1949, During the Night, was denied a license by the censor.

Radio plays
 The Nine Fifty Up Express. Collected in The Nine Fifty Up Express

Non-fiction
How to Write a Detective Novel
The Four Gospels in One Story: written as a modern biography
A New Zealand Tragedy (1936), included in The Anatomy of Murder by The Detection Club

Anthologies containing stories by Freeman Wills Crofts
 Great Short Stories of Detection, Mystery and Horror 2nd Series (1931)
 Great Short Stories of Detection, Mystery and Horror 3rd Series (1934)
 The Mystery Book (1934)
 The Great Book of Thrillers (1935)
 The Evening Standard Detective Book (1950)
 The Case of the Vanishing Spinster, and other mystery stories, chosen by Susan Dickinson (1972)
 Fifty Famous Detectives of Fiction (1983)
 The Scoop and Behind the Screen (1983) (Originally published in The Listener (1931) and (1930), both written by members of The Detection Club)
 Great Irish Detective Stories, edited by Peter Haining (1993)
 The Longman Anthology of Detective Fiction (2004)
 ‘'Bodies from the Library'’, edited by Tony Medawar (2018). Includes the short story 'Dark Waters'

Lost short stories
These stories are known to have been published but no copies of the publications concerned are believed to exist today
 "Nemesis", published in Round About [Guildford Round Table Christmas Annual, 1933]

Adaptations of work in other media
Free @ Last TV, who produced the Sky1/Acorn TV series Agatha Raisin are developing a television series based on the Inspector French novels.

References

Sources
Oxford Dictionary of National Biography

External links
 A complete bibliography
 
 
 
 
 
Ebooks by Freeman Wills Crofts at Standard Ebooks
 complete text of The Pit Prop Syndicate from Project Gutenberg

1879 births
1957 deaths
Irish crime fiction writers
Members of the Detection Club
20th-century Irish novelists
20th-century Irish male writers
Engineers from Dublin (city)
People educated at Methodist College Belfast
People educated at Campbell College
Irish male novelists
20th-century Irish engineers
Irish male short story writers
20th-century Irish short story writers
People from Blackheath, London